Chloroformic acid is an unstable chemical compound with the formula ClCO2H. It is the single acyl-halide derivative of carbonic acid (phosgene is the double acyl-halide derivative). Chloroformic acid is also structurally related to formic acid, which has a hydrogen instead of the chlorine. Despite the similar name, it is very different from chloroform.

Chloroformic acid itself is too unstable to be handled for chemical reactions. However, many esters of this carboxylic acid are stable and these chloroformates are important reagents in organic chemistry. They are used to prepare mixed carboxylic acid anhydrides used in peptide synthesis. 
Important chloroformate esters include 4-nitrophenyl chloroformate, fluorenylmethyloxycarbonylchloride, benzyl chloroformate and ethyl chloroformate.

See also
 Chloroacetic acids
 Dichloroacetic acid
 Trichloroacetic acid

References

Carboxylic acids
Chloroformates